Bayt Jirja was a Palestinian Arab village 15.5 km Northeast of Gaza. In 1931 the village consisted of 115 houses. It was overrun by Israeli forces during operation Yo'av in the 1948 Arab-Israeli war. Bayt Jirja was found depopulated in November 1948, during "clean up sweeps" to expel any partial inhabited villages and destroy village housing to prevent any possible re-occupation in the area. The village was completely destroyed after the occupation and only one tomb remains.

History

Bayt Jirja contained the archaeological site of Khirbat 'Amuda, excavation there in 2005 yielded coins and pottery fragments from the Byzantine and early Islamic period.

Khirbat 'Amuda was known to the Crusaders as Amouhde, and pottery fragments, cisterns, and a pool have also been found there.

The Arab geographer Yaqut, writing in the 1220s called the village for "Jirja", and said it was the birthplace of Abu al-Fadl al-Jirja, at one time the major authority in Palestine on hadith.

Ottoman era
In 1517, Bayt Jirja was incorporated into the Ottoman Empire with the rest of Palestine, and in 1596 the village appeared in the Ottoman tax registers (named "Bayt Harja" (Farja)) as being in the nahiya (subdistrict) of Gaza, part of the Sanjak of Gaza, with  a population of 71 households and 14 bachelors, an estimated 468 persons, all Muslims. The villagers paid a fixed tax rate of 33,3% on a number of crops, including wheat, barley and fruit trees, as well as on goats and beehives; a total of 18,500  akçe. All of the revenue went to a waqf.

Sometime after this, the village must have been destroyed, as a marble slab at the entrance to the yard of the village mosque proclaimed that Abdullah Pasha of Acre, via his delegate Mohammed Shahin, had rebuilt the village in 1825–26.

In 1838, Beit Jerja was noted as a Muslim village in the Gaza area.

In May 1863, Victor Guérin visited the village. He found it had 370 inhabitants, and a wali with ancient granite columns. Socin found from an official Ottoman village list from about 1870 that Bayt Jirja had a population of 106, with a total of 34 houses, though the population count included men, only. Hartmann found that Bet Dschardscha had 32 houses.

In 1883 the PEF's Survey of Western Palestine described Bayt Jirja as small, with gardens, and supplied with water from cisterns and a pond.

British Mandate era
In the 1922 census of Palestine, conducted by the British Mandate authorities, Beit Jerja had a population of 397 inhabitants, all Muslims, increasing in the 1931 census to 619, still all Muslim, in 115 houses.

The villagers kept a shrine, located on the eastern edge and overlooking Wadi al-Abd, and which they believed to be the tomb of "prophet" (nabi) Jirja. An elementary school was established in the center of village in 1932, and it had 67 students in the mid-1940s. The village center also contained some small shops. There were a number of wells, ranging in depth from 30 to 80 meters, which supplied drinking and irrigation water.

In the 1945 statistics the population of Beit Jirja consisted of 940 Muslims with a land area of 8,015 dunams, according to an official land and population survey. Of this, 434 dunams were designated for citrus and bananas, 
618 for plantations and irrigable land, 6,911 for cereals, while 25 dunams were built-up areas.

1948 War
The village was probably captured in early November 1948, along with neighbouring al-Majdal, during the last phase of Operation Yoav. The villagers fled or were expelled and the village was destroyed.
 According to the Palestinian historian Walid Khalidi, what remained of the village in 1992 was: The site is encircled by barbed wire fencing, with only the street and scattered rubble still visible. One house on the northern edge of the village remains, along with some sycamore trees and cactuses. Some village lands are cultivated, while others are covered by woods.

See also
Depopulated Palestinian locations in Israel

References

Bibliography

External links

Survey of Western Palestine, Map 20: Israeli Antiquities Aurhority, Wikimedia Commons 
 (Abu Ahmed, Gaza city, a descendant of Bayt Jirja refugees)

Arab villages depopulated during the 1948 Arab–Israeli War
Arab villages depopulated prior to the 1948 Arab–Israeli War
District of Gaza